The River Sid, situated in East Devon, is often claimed to be the shortest complete river in England. It flows for  southwards from a source in Crowpits Covert (OSGB36 Grid reference SY138963) at a height of 206 metres above sea level. The source is at the head of a goyle or small ravine.

The underlying geology is impermeable silty mudstones and sandstones of the Triassic Keuper marl, overlain with permeable Greensand and clay-with-flints. The junction between the Greensand and Keuper Marl forms a spring line.

The river flows through Sidbury and Sidford to Sidmouth and is fed by springs flowing from East Hill and water from the Roncombe Stream, the Snod Brook and the Woolbrook. In Sidmouth the river outflows at the Ham through a shingle bar.

The Sid Vale Association, the first Civic Society in Britain (founded in 1846), is based in the Sid Vale.

References

Sid
Sidmouth